Clistosaccidae is a family of parasitic barnacles belonging to the bizarre and highly apomorphic infraclass Rhizocephala, which is part of the barnacle subclass Cirripedia.

The family contains two genera:

 Clistosaccus Lilljeborg, 1861
 Sylon M. Sars, 1870

References

Barnacles
Parasitic crustaceans
Crustacean families